The Södermanland Runic Inscription 333  is a Viking Age runestone engraved in Old Norse with the Younger Futhark runic alphabet. It is located at the abandoned Ärja Church in Strängnäs Municipality. The style of the runestone is a categorized as Fp.

Inscription
Transliteration of the runes into Latin characters

 : amuit · rsti · sina · þina · yti · suna · sina · rnulfu/unulfu · aku · hrenki bruþur · sena · uarþi · uti · terebina · i · kalmarna · sutuma · furu · afu · skani ×× eski · rsti · runa · þasi ×
Old Norse transcription:

 

English translation:

 "Ámundi(?) raised this stone in memory of his son Rúnulfr/Unnulfr, and Hringr(?), his brother. (He) was killed out in the Kalmarnir sound, (as they) travelled from Scania. Áskell/Ásgeirr carved these runes."

References

Runestones in Södermanland
Runestones in memory of Viking warriors